Dog Eat Dog (original title (NW): De Hensynsløse) is a Norwegian live action short film directed by Rikke Gregersen. The film received the Special Jury Prize at the 2019 BAFTA Student Film Awards and the silver medal in the Narrative International Category at the 46th Student Academy Awards.

Plot 

Silje wants to leave her boyfriend, but when she finds him in a half-hearted attempt to hang himself she has to reconsider, in fear of acting reckless.

Awards 

The short was part of the Oscar predictive world touring screening The animation Showcase 2019 (Live Action Screenings).

References

External links 

 

2018 short films
2018 films